Hepingmen Station is a station on Line 2 of the Beijing Subway.

Station Layout 
The station has an underground island platform.

Exits 
There are 8 exits, lettered A1, A2, B1, B2, C1, C2, D1, and D2. Exit A1 is accessible.

References

External links

Railway stations in China opened in 1971
Beijing Subway stations in Xicheng District